Naked is the second studio album by American R&B recording artist Marques Houston. It was released by The Ultimate Group and Universal Records on May 24, 2005 in the United States. 
The album features guest appearances by Joe Budden, Rufus Blaq and fellow former Immature member Young Rome. In the United States, Naked peaked at number 13 on the Billboard 200, and peaked at number 5 on Billboards Top R&B/Hip-Hop Albums.

Critical reception

Allmusic editor Andy Kellman rated the album three out of five stars. He found that "Naked is no deeper than 2003's MH, which most of his fans will find perfectly acceptable. It offers a similar mix of earnest slow jams and sexually frank club tracks. The best moments involve adequate production facsimiles of Just Blaze, Kanye West, and The Neptunes. Another thing that works to Houston's benefit is the shorter running time: Nakeds eleven songs are a lot easier to digest than MHs 17, which also means that there's better quality control."

Track listing 

Notes
 denotes co-producer

Charts

Weekly charts

Year-end charts

Certifications

References 

2005 albums
Albums produced by the Underdogs (production team)
Marques Houston albums
Universal Records albums